Stokes Field is a   Local Nature Reserve in Long Ditton in Surrey. It is owned and managed by Elmbridge Borough Council.

The field has diverse habitats with a pond, scrubland, woodland and grassland. Flora include crab apple trees, cuckoo flowers, pyramidal orchid, blackberries, and rosehip.

There is access from Sugden Road.

Gallery

References

Local Nature Reserves in Surrey